General  is a Japanese general who serves as the Chief of Staff, Joint Staff of the Japan Self-Defense Forces (JSDF). Before assuming the post in April 2019, he was the Chief of the Ground Staff at the JGSDF.

Career

Yamazaki graduated from the 27th semester of the Civil Engineering Department of the National Defense Academy of Japan in March 1983, and started his career as a military engineer, and later held various key positions in the engineering field and staff positions. He also served as the Director of the Logistics Management Division, as commander of the 8th Facility Battalion while subsequently serving as the Facility Manager of the 8th Division (Japan) headquarters and as the Sendai garrison commander under the North Eastern Army in March 2001. Yamazaki was also the commanding General of the 4th Engineer Brigade, based in Camp Okubo in Uji, Kyoto Prefecture in 2008. In August 2002, he served at the Affairs Section of the Ground Staff Office, Human Resources Department; and was named as the chief executive of the 1st Personnel Division of the Personnel Division at the Ground Staff Office.

Yamazaki also attended various courses in the country and abroad, as he completed the Ranger Course of the JGSDF, where he is a qualified member of the Special Forces Group and was awarded the JGSDF Ranger Badge. He also completed the CO-OP program, a joint collaboration project of the JGSDF and the United States Army, Japan in 1995, where he was among the first students to complete the course. Then-Colonel Yamazaki also studied at the National War College in Washington, D.C., where he graduated in April 2005. He served as a researcher at the Ground Self-Defense Force Research Division in August 2006, before being named as the Ground Planning Officer in the Equipment Planning Department 4 months later, in December 2006. He was named as the commander of Facility No. 4 and thereafter served as commander of the Okubo Garrison in Camp Okubo in August 2008, and was named as the Deputy Chief of Staff of the Western Army in June 2010. He became the Director General, Personnel Department of the Ground Staff Office in July 2012. Yamazaki was named as the commander of the 9th Division in August 2014 before becoming the Vice Chief of Staff, Joint Staff in March 2015; and became commander of the Northern Army, based at Sapporo in Hokkaidō in July 2016.

In August 2017, he was appointed 35th Chief of the Ground Staff of the Japan Ground Self-Defense Force, the highest position in the JGSDF after the resignation of General Toshiya Okabe and former Defense Minister Tomomi Inada amidst claims over a cover up scandal within the Ministry of Defense, exposing the danger Japanese peacekeepers were facing in South Sudan. As the Chief of the Ground Staff, he strengthened Japan's strategic partnerships and mutual defense policies in the Asia-Pacific Region, such as strengthening cooperation to the Philippines, where he met with then-Commanding General of the Philippine Army Lieutenant General Macairog Alberto, and the Chief of Staff of the Armed Forces of the Philippines General Benjamin Madrigal Jr.; and the United States, where he met numerous US military generals and continued to enhance the US-Japan military relations.

In April 2019, Yamazaki was appointed by then-Prime Minister Shinzo Abe as the Chief of Staff, Joint Staff, the JSDF's highest position. As the Chief of the Joint Staff, he continued his approach on nourishing Japan's role in the Asia-Pacific and abroad, such as the United States, where he met with Chairman of the Joint Chiefs of Staff General Mark A. Milley; in Israel, where he met Lieutenant General Aviv Kochavi; in South Korea, where he met two Chairmen of the Joint Chiefs of Staff General Park Han-ki and General Won In-choul,; in India, where he met with General Bipin Rawat, and other countries such as Brazil, where he met with the Commander of the Brazilian Army Army General Edson Leal Pujol. General Yamazaki also vowed to strengthen Japan's military capabilities and ensuring that Japan can defend its sovereignty in the East China Sea, particularly in the Senkaku Islands, as the country faces territorial disputes and incursions from China's China Coast Guard, the People's Liberation Army Navy, and the People's Liberation Army Air Force. Yamazaki also vowed to strengthen Japan's presence in the East China Sea and in the South China Sea, and maintain the status quo in securing the Taiwan Strait, as Taiwan and China continues to escalate its tensions amidst a possible invasion of Taiwan by the People's Liberation Army.

On May 19, 2022, General Yamazaki was the first high ranked JSDF officer to attend a NATO Military Chiefs of Defense meeting in Brussels, Belgium, and expanded mutual cooperation efforts between the JSDF and NATO within the global scene. This was also expanded during Yamazaki's meeting with the NATO Chair of the NATO Military Committee Lieutenant Admiral Rob Bauer, where the two leaders collaborated in enhancing Japan's partnership with the NATO alliance. Yamazaki was initially set to retire on 16 January 2022, as he reached his mandatory military retirement age as Chief of Staff, Joint Staff, of 62 years old. Yamazaki's term as Chief of Staff, Joint Staff was extended for 6 months under an ordinance signed by the Ministry of Defense, and is set to last until 15 July 2023.

Biography
March 1983: Graduated from the National Defense Academy of Japan (27th term) and joined the Japan Ground Self-Defense Force
July 1997 (Heisei 9): Promoted to lieutenant colonel
March 2001: Commander of the 8th Facility Battalion and Facility Manager of the 8th Division (Japan) headquarters and Sendai garrison commander
January 2002 (Heisei 14): promoted to colonel
August: Affairs Section, Ground Staff Office, Human Resources Department
August 2003: Leader, 1st Personnel Division, Personnel Division, Ground Staff Staff
April 2005: With Central Archives (studied in the National War College)
August 2006: Ground Self-Defense Force Research Division researcher
December: Ground Planning Officer, Equipment Planning 
August 1, 2008: Promoted to deputy major general, Commander of Facility No. 4 and Commander of Okubo Garrison
June 8, 2010: Deputy Chief of Staff for the Western Army (Japan)
July 26, 2012: Director of Human Resources, Ground Staff
August 5, 2014: Promotion to lieutenant general, 9th Division (Japan) Commander
March 30, 2015: Joint Staff Staff Deputy Director
July 1, 2016: Appointed the 36th General Director of the Northern District
August 8, 2017: Appointed 35th Chief of Ground Staff
April 1, 2019: Became the 6th Chief of Staff, Joint Staff.
January 16, 2023: Term as Chief of Staff, Joint Staff extended for 6 months.

Dates of promotion

Awards
  Legion of Merit (Commander)
  Meritorious Service Medal
  Officer, Legion of Honour
  Honorary Officer of the Order of Australia
  JGSDF Ranger Badge
 Order of Saint Maurice (Peregrinus)

Defensive memorial cordons
  2nd Defensive Memorial Cordon
  10th Defensive Memorial Cordon
  11th Defensive Memorial Cordon
  15th Defensive Memorial Cordon with 1 gold cherry blossom
  16th Defensive Memorial Cordon 
  18th Defensive Memorial Cordon 
  19th Defensive Memorial Cordon 
  20th Defensive Memorial Cordon 
  22nd Defensive Memorial Cordon
  23rd Defensive Memorial Cordon
  25th Defensive Memorial Cordon 
  26th Defensive Memorial Cordon with 2 silver cherry blossoms 
  32nd Defensive Memorial Cordon
  33rd Defensive Memorial Cordon
  37th Defensive Memorial Cordon 
  40th Defensive Memorial Cordon 
  41st Defensive Memorial Cordon

References

1961 births
Chiefs of Staff of the Japan Ground Self-Defense Force
Living people
Military personnel from Yamanashi Prefecture
Honorary Officers of the Order of Australia